Charles II: The Power and the Passion is a British television film in four episodes, broadcast on BBC One in 2003, and produced by the BBC in association with the A&E Network in the United States, which also released it in North America with heavy edits. It was produced by Kate Harwood, directed by Joe Wright and written by screenwriter Adrian Hodges, whose credits include David Copperfield and The Lost World.

Synopsis 
The film covers the life of Charles II – beginning just before his Restoration to the throne in 1660. He was deeply traumatized by the execution of his father in 1649, after the former's defeat in the Wars of the Three Kingdoms; it begins, however, with his penurious exile in Antwerp in 1658. The film's emphasis is on his court, and his conflicts with Parliament – essentially the same issues which led to the Civil War between his father Charles I and the House of Commons, the politics of who would succeed him – and his relationships with his family, his mistresses and his illegitimate son James, Duke of Monmouth.

The film dramatizes both Charles's laziness and frivolous diversion, leaving political issues to his chancellor Sir Edward Hyde, but becoming increasingly irritated by the paternalistic way which Hyde behaves towards him. Dismissing Hyde, he takes the reins of power himself, determined that his brother should succeed him in the event of his not having any legitimate children (despite opposition to James's Catholicism), and that Royal Power not be challenged by Parliament.

The production won the British Academy Television Award for Best Drama Serial in 2004. Composer Rob Lane received an nomination for Outstanding Music Composition for a Miniseries, Movie or a Special (Dramatic Underscore) at the 32nd International Emmy Awards.

Summary of differences between American & UK versions 

It was shown in the United States under the title The Last King: The Power and the Passion of King Charles II.  This version, however, was heavily edited.  The original British version is a four part series. For American broadcast, over an hour was edited out, and it was shown in two 90 min (with commercials, 2 hour) installments.

The edits often make little regard for either the script's continuity or coherence.  Unless otherwise stated, items said to have been left out refer to the version shown in America and the DVD version available.

Many things are left out including the full details of the Treaty of Dover which contained a secret clause wherein Charles promised Louis XIV, his first cousin, to convert to Catholicism for an enormous sum of money. Louis also promised six thousand French troops if Charles needed them.

The edited American version also leaves out Charles's trickery of George Villiers, Duke of Buckingham (played by Rupert Graves) regarding the treaty's secret provision.  Thus, Buckingham's later opposition to Charles's insistence that his brother James (later James II played by Charlie Creed-Miles) inherit the throne appears to be motivated by merely spite and jealousy rather than a feeling of betrayal.

James's marriage to Anne, daughter of Sir Edward Hyde, made Earl of Clarendon by Charles in 1661, is also unexplained in the American version. Played by Tabitha Wady, Anne is only in two scenes, when Charles meets Catherine of Braganza and later, in conversation with Lady Castlemaine as the Queen "took the waters" at Tunbridge Wells, where many noble and wealthy women went to seek treatment for infertility.

The part where James and Charles are discussing James divorcing Anne was also removed, further confusing viewers not familiar with the history.

The conversations between "Minette" (Charles' sister Henrietta-Anne) and Louise de Kéroualle with Louis XIV (played by Anne-Marie Duff, Perkins Thierry, and Mélanie Thierry, respectively) are all in French with English subtitles in the British version. In the American version, only the conversation between Minette and Louis, where Louis asks Minette to act as his envoy to Charles is in English (perhaps because of the perception that American audiences dislike subtitles).

Another scene edited out shows "Minette"'s husband, the Duke of Orléans, called "Monsieur" (the traditional appellation for the King's eldest brother), a notorious homosexual libertine, battering and raping her after insulting her.

All in all, the cuts made by A&E distort the picture of Charles II's personality and political maneuvers whereas the version shown in Britain displays much more fully Charles II's "shifty insincerity" (as Will & Ariel Durant put in it The Age of Louis XIV) and his willingness to sacrifice loyal servants at need. Indeed, the cuts seem to have been made with little regard for continuity or narrative coherence in the American version.

The American version presents Charles as the last "absolute" monarch of England.  This does not dovetail with the historical reality (see the Durants and Fraser). In fact, Charles maintained his independence of Parliament in his last years only by taking French money. He also ensured his brother's succession to the throne not through royal command but through Parliamentary manoeuvres the nation's reluctance to see another civil war so soon after the First and Second English Civil Wars in the 1640s.

The full BBC version gives a more detailed, coherent presentation of the story of Charles' life and (temporary) victory over his opponents in Parliament.

Three scenes of brief nudity were also removed.

The only version available on DVD in the US & Canada is the one broadcast on A&E.  The British DVD retains the full BBC version.  Due to technical reasons, the most important impediment being the different television formats used in the two countries, see PAL and NTSC; also (see DVD article for further details on controversial "copy protection" measures), the British version cannot be readily viewed with the vast majority of American set-top DVD players.  The aforementioned television format differences also make viewing a VHS copy of the British version difficult on US and Canadian TVs.

Historical veracity 
The production team and the writer made an attempt to make this version as close to history as the constraints of squeezing 27 years of history into 4 hours allow.  The script appears to be heavily influenced by Antonia Fraser's bestselling 1979 biography Charles II.  In the "Making of Charles II" Rufus Sewell states that he used Fraser's book as guide to his portrayal of the penultimate Stuart king.

There are some issues of fact which are altered or omitted in the script.

The script implies, in a statement by George Villiers, Duke of Buckingham, that both his and Charles' father had died fighting for the Royalist cause.  In fact, George Villiers, 1st Duke of Buckingham, was assassinated by a disgruntled, perhaps mentally unbalanced, navy officer named John Felton in 1628.
Before arriving in England, at Parliament's invitation, to take up his throne, Charles II promised an amnesty "for all [his enemies] except those exempted by Parliament."  After much debate, Parliament decided that all of the enemies of Charles I should be amnestied except for those who had signed the latter's death warrant.  The series portrays Charles as pardoning some of his father's "murderers" after the brutal execution of a number (in fact 15).  In fact, the thirteen not executed were not pardoned, but sentenced to life imprisonment.
In one scene, shown in the British version only, Charles is seen to cast a piece of paper into a fire, in a context that heavily implies it was a marriage contract between himself and Lucy Walter, mother of his favourite, and ill-fated, natural son, James, Duke of Monmouth. Charles's alleged marriage to Lucy Walter is heavily contested by historians. 
Above, Charles kept his friend and adviser, the Duke of Buckingham, in the dark about the secret provisions of the Treaty of Dover.  Buckingham was later sent to Paris to sign a sham treaty with Louis XIV.  This is left out of the mini-series altogether.
In one scene, Charles visits his mistress Lady Castlemaine in her apartments at Whitehall Palace, only to find her in bed with a young John Churchill, future Duke of Marlborough, who would become one of England's most famous military commanders and play an important part in the War of the Spanish Succession.  A brief conversation ensues between the King and Churchill.  In reality, Lady Castlemaine was at one of her houses and Churchill leapt from a window to avoid a scene with the King.
Sir Edward Hyde is so addressed throughout the mini-series even though he had been made Earl of Clarendon by the King in 1661.  Thus he is, from that time, properly called Clarendon as he is by historians.  In the same manner, Anthony Ashley Cooper, Lord Ashley, is referred to as the Earl of Shaftesbury even though he did not obtain the title until 1674.  Presumably, both names were used constantly to avoid confusing viewers unfamiliar with the period.

There are also certain omissions in the script.

While the mini-series begins with Charles I's execution, shown in a nightmare of Charles II, the real beginning of the latter's story is in his exile in Antwerp in 1658.  In fact, this was the last of many places to which Charles wandered in the 15 years of his exile, including the Scilly Isles, the Channel Island of Jersey, France, and, briefly, Scotland.  The only reference to these wanderings is in the reconciliation scene between Charles and the Duke of Buckingham, when Charles says, responding to Buckingham's statement that, "It's amazing what [Parliament] will do when they feel guilty."  Charles' answer, "They think money will make me forget the last twenty years.  Well, they will find I have a very good memory."
Charles tells his nephew, William of Orange, that "both of his sisters" are dead. Charles had three sisters: Mary, Elizabeth and "Minette" (Henrietta Anne). Mary, the mother of William of Orange, died in 1660. Elizabeth died during her captivity by the Parliamentarians (see Roundheads), but she is never mentioned in either version.

Cast

Rufus Sewell ... King Charles II
Rupert Graves ... George Villiers, Duke of Buckingham
Helen McCrory ... Barbara Villiers, Countess of Castlemaine
Christian Coulson ... James, Duke of Monmouth
Ian McDiarmid ... Sir Edward Hyde
Shirley Henderson ... Catherine of Braganza
Martin Freeman ... Lord Shaftesbury
Charlie Creed-Miles ... James, Duke of York
Anne-Marie Duff ... Minette (Henrietta Anne of England)
Shaun Dingwall ... The Earl of Danby
Emma Pierson ... Nell Gwynn
David Bradley ....  Sir Edmund Berry Godfrey
Diana Rigg ... Queen Henrietta Maria
Alice Patten ... Lady Frances Stewart
Garry Cooper ... General Monck
Thierry Perkins-Lyautey ... King Louis XIV
Cyrille Thouvenin ... Monsieur
Martin Turner ... Charles I
Nick Bagnall ... Hopkins
Sean Biggerstaff ... Henry, Duke of Gloucester
Predrag Bjelac ... Portuguese Courtier (as Pedja Bjelac)
Vitezslav Bouchner ... Victim #3
Sarah Cameron ... Young girl
Brian Caspe ... Doctor #2
Robert East ... The Earl of Arlington
Minja Filipovic ... Anne of Braganza
Zuzana Hodkova ... Lady in Waiting to Queen Henrietta Maria
Dorian Lough ... Clifford
Eddie Marsan ... Titus Oates
Curtis Mathew ... Victim #2
Ryan Nelson ... Young Monmouth
Jan Nemesovsky ... Victim #1
Michael Pober ... Tutor
Richard Rowlands ... Sir Roger Palmer
Joel Sugerman ... Antwerp servant
Jochum ten Haaf ... William of Orange
Mélanie Thierry ... Louise de Kéroualle
Simon Treves ... M.P.
Peter Wight ... The Duke of Ormonde
Andrew Woodall ... The Earl of Essex
Simon Woods ... Captain Churchill

References

External links
 
 BBC: Official site 
 
 Charles II Encyclopædia Britannica. 2006. Encyclopædia Britannica Online. 29 Sept. 2006

BBC television royalty dramas
BBC television docudramas
BBC television dramas
Cultural depictions of Charles II of England
Films set in the 17th century
2003 British television series debuts
2003 British television series endings
2000s British drama television series
2000s British television miniseries
English-language television shows
Cultural depictions of Louis XIV
Cultural depictions of John Churchill, Duke of Marlborough
Cultural depictions of William III of England
Cultural depictions of Titus Oates
Cultural depictions of Charles I of England
Cultural depictions of Barbara Palmer, 1st Duchess of Cleveland
Cultural depictions of Louise de Kérouaille, Duchess of Portsmouth
Cultural depictions of Nell Gwyn
Cultural depictions of Catherine of Braganza
Cultural depictions of James II of England